Parechiniscus is a genus of tardigrades in the family Echiniscidae. It was named and described by Lucien Cuénot in 1926.

Species
The genus includes the following species:
 Parechiniscus chitonides Cuénot, 1926
 Parechiniscus unispinosus da Cunha, 1947

References

Further reading
Cuénot, 1926 : Description d'un tardigrade nouveau de la faune française. (Description of a New Tardigrate in French Fauna) Comptes rendus hebdomadaires des séances de l’Académie des sciences, vol. 182, p. 744-745.
 Nomenclator Zoologicus info

Echiniscidae
Tardigrade genera